Johann Lion (born 4 March 1972) is a French former professional footballer who played as a midfielder.

References
 

1972 births
Living people
French footballers
Association football midfielders
AS Nancy Lorraine players
ES Troyes AC players
Ligue 2 players
Vendée Fontenay Foot players
People from Creil
Sportspeople from Oise
Footballers from Hauts-de-France